Murder in Greenwich Village is a 1937 American mystery film directed by Albert S. Rogell and starring Richard Arlen, Fay Wray and Raymond Walburn. The screenplay involves an heiress who is falsely accused of murder. The film's sets were designed by the art directors Lionel Banks and Stephen Goosson.

Plot
When she is falsely accused of murder, an heiress ropes in a photographer to provide her with an alibi.

Cast
 Richard Arlen as Steve Havens Jackson Jr. 
 Fay Wray as Kay Cabot aka Lucky 
 Raymond Walburn as The Senator  
 Wyn Cahoon as Flo Melville  
 Scott Kolk as Larry Foster (as Scott Kolton)
 Thurston Hall as Charles Cabot 
 Marc Lawrence as Rusty Morgan  
 Gene Morgan as Henderson  
 Mary Russell as Antoinette aka Angel Annie McGillicutty 
 George McKay as Officer  
 Leon Ames as Rodney Hunter  
 Barry Macollum as Murphy  
 Marjorie Reynolds  as Molly Murphy

See also
 List of American films of 1937

References

External links
 

1937 films
1937 mystery films
1930s English-language films
American mystery films
Films directed by Albert S. Rogell
Columbia Pictures films
American black-and-white films
1930s American films